Un uomo da bruciare (internationally released as A Man for Burning) is a 1962 Italian drama film. It is the first feature film directed by Valentino Orsini and Paolo and Vittorio Taviani.

It entered the 1962 Venice Film Festival, in which it won the Italian Film Critics Award.

It is based on the life of the Sicilian union organizer Salvatore Carnevale.

Cast 
Gian Maria Volonté: Salvatore
Didi Perego: Barbara
Spiros Focás: Jachino
Turi Ferro: Don Vincenzo
Marina Malfatti: Wilma
Marcella Rovena

References

External links

1962 films
Films about the labor movement
Films directed by Paolo and Vittorio Taviani
Films directed by Valentino Orsini
Films set in Sicily
Italian drama films
1962 directorial debut films
1960s Italian-language films
1960s Italian films